Vesta Oral Stoudt (April 13, 1891 – May 9, 1966) was a factory worker during the Second World War famous for her letter to President Franklin D. Roosevelt suggesting the use of adhesive tape to improve ammunition boxes.

Early life 
Vesta Oral Wildman was born on 13 April 1891 in Prophetstown, Illinois, to Gertrude Caroline (née Johnson) and Ulyses Simpson Grant Wildman, one of five sisters.

Suggestion to use adhesive cotton duck tape on WWII ammunition boxes 
During the Second World War, Stoudt worked at the Green River Ordnance Plant in Dixon, Illinois packing ammunition boxes. She recognized that the way ammunition boxes were sealed made them difficult for soldiers to open in a hurry. She suggested this idea to her bosses at work, who didn't implement the change.  On February 10, 1943, she wrote a letter to President Franklin D. Roosevelt explaining the problem and offering a solution:

Roosevelt approved of the idea which he sent to the War Production Board, who wrote back to Stoudt:

They tasked the Revolite Corporation to create the product. Stoudt received the Chicago Tribune War Worker Award for her idea and for her persistence with it. She is often misattributed as the inventor of duct tape. However, numerous variations of adhesive cotton duck tape had existed for decades, nor did she invent the specific formulation of the popularized duct tape. The valuable contribution she made was the suggestion to use adhesive duck tape on ammunition boxes.

Personal life 
Vesta Wildman married Harry Issac Stoudt on 19 October 1910 in Morgan, Illinois. They went on to have eight children.

Vesta O. Stoudt died age 75 at the Whiteside County Nursing Home in Prophetstown, on May 9, 1966, following a long illness. She was survived by five children, twenty grandchildren, and eight great-grandchildren.

References

1891 births
1966 deaths
Women inventors
People from Prophetstown, Illinois